Benedykt Stanisław Augustyniak (1 March 1932 – 18 April 2017) was a Polish rower. He competed in the men's coxless four event at the 1960 Summer Olympics.

References

External links
 

1932 births
2017 deaths
Polish male rowers
Olympic rowers of Poland
Rowers at the 1960 Summer Olympics
Sportspeople from Poznań